James Harris III is an American politician from New Orleans, Louisiana. A Democrat, Harris has represented District 4 in the Louisiana State Senate since 2020; he previously represented District 99 in the Louisiana House of Representatives between 2016 and 2020.

Career
Before entering elected office, Harris worked as an aide for U.S. Representative Cedric Richmond, as well as working for several other elected officials in the state. With Richmond's backing, he ran in 2015 for District 99 in the Louisiana House of Representatives. Harris defeated Markeita Prevost and Ray Crawford after two rounds of voting.

In 2019, Harris announced that he would run for District 4 in the Louisiana State Senate, which was vacated by Wesley Bishop, Harris' predecessor in the House. Harris was elected with no opponents from either party.

References

Living people
Democratic Party members of the Louisiana House of Representatives
Politicians from New Orleans
African-American state legislators in Louisiana
21st-century American politicians
Morehouse College alumni
Southern University Law Center alumni
Year of birth missing (living people)
21st-century African-American politicians